Wales won the new European Championship, beating England for the first time since 1977 and defeating France in Carcassonne to the first time take home the new title for the first time since 1938.

It was the first time a European Championship had been held since being cancelled after last tournament in 1981. The traditional format was used, whereby the three founding nations compete, each playing a total of two matches, where no final is staged.

It was held in early 1995, to accommodate for the Rugby League World Cup taking place in the latter stages of the same year.

Results

Final standings

European Nations Cup
International rugby league competitions hosted by the United Kingdom
International rugby league competitions hosted by France
European rugby league championship
European Rugby League Championship
European Rugby League Championship
European Rugby League Championship